Greece is a nation that has competed at the Hopman Cup tournament on two occasions, in 2002, when they lost to Italy in the qualification play-off and in the 2019 Hopman Cup where they narrowly lost in the group stage.

Players
This is a list of players who have played for Greece in the Hopman Cup.

Results

References

Hopman Cup teams
Hopman Cup
Hopman Cup